Harbour Bridge or Harbor Bridge may refer to:

Auckland Harbour Bridge, in Auckland, New Zealand
Tauranga Harbour Bridge, in Tauranga, New Zealand 
Great Egg Harbor Bridge, in New Jersey, United States
Saint John Harbour Bridge, in Saint John, New Brunswick, Canada
Sydney Harbour Bridge, in Sydney, Australia
Wick Harbour Bridge, in Wick, Scotland
Corpus Christi Harbor Bridge,  Texas, United States
Prístavný most (literally Harbour Bridge), in Bratislava, Slovakia